Maryland elected its members October 6, 1806.

See also 
 Maryland's 7th congressional district special election, 1806
 United States House of Representatives elections, 1806 and 1807
 List of United States representatives from Maryland

Notes 

1806
Maryland
United States House of Representatives